Cygany may refer to the following places:
Cygany, Łódź Voivodeship (central Poland)
Cygany, Masovian Voivodeship (east-central Poland)
Cygany, Subcarpathian Voivodeship (south-east Poland)
Cygany, Pomeranian Voivodeship (north Poland)

 Cygany, Polish name for Tsyhany (western Ukraine)